Borys Karnicki (25 September 1907 – 15 February 1985) was a submarine commander of the Polish Navy during World War II.

Biography 
In 1927 Borys graduated in Bydgoszcz. He finished the Polish Naval Academy in 1930. He served on the torpedo boat ORP Podhalanin then on the submarines ORP Żbik, ORP Ryś and finally . He completed a course of naval artillery and the submarine navigation course.

At the outbreak of war he was the executive officer on the ORP Wilk. After unsuccessful patrols in the Baltic Sea, Wilk 
passed the Danish straits (Øresund) on 14/15 September and arrived at Scotland. During the long months the crew has nothing to be proud of. Moral was low. On 13 April 1940 he became the commanding officer of Wilk. On 20 June 1940 at 0.25 am, the ORP Wilk rammed an unidentified object at position . It is probable that it was a German U-boat U-102 or U-122 (both disappeared in June or July). Some suggested, that it might have been an Allied Dutch submarine O13, also lost at sea around that time. According to newest analysis of Wilk's damages the object was most likely a buoy. H.R. Bachmann and Jerzy Pertek noted that in the Wilk'''s ship's logbook there is no mention of ramming an U-boat.

At the same time, when it became clear that ORP Orzeł was definitely lost, the Royal Navy decided to lease an U-class submarine to Polish Navy. The vessel was named ORP Sokół. On 19 January 1941 Karnicki became its commander. He patrolled the Bay of Biscay off the French port of Brest. Then he was moved to Malta and participated in the attack of Pylos after which the general Władysław Sikorski decorated him with the Virtuti Militari Cross (he took it off his own breast).ORP Sokół and the other Polish submarine operating in the Mediterranean  gained the name of Terrible Twins'' because of their achievements.
After the war ended Karnicki remained in exile in England where he died on 15 February 1985. The urn with his ashes was brought home by his wife and daughters. 
He has been buried in the Polish Naval Cemetery in Gdynia.

Awards and decorations
 Virtuti Militari, Silver Cross (Poland)
 Order of Polonia Restituta Knight's Cross
 Cross of Valour (Poland) 
 Cross of Merit with Swords (Poland) Golden Cross
 Naval Medal three times
 Distinguished Service Order
 Atlantic Star
 Africa Star
 Order of the Dannebrog

Notes

References

External links 
 Grób gen.dyw.W.P Aleksandra Karnickiego i symboliczny grób komendanta Borysa Karnickego
 

1907 births
1985 deaths
Polish military personnel of World War II
Recipients of the Cross of Valour (Poland)
Recipients of the Silver Cross of the Virtuti Militari
Polish submarine commanders
Polish Navy officers
Order of the Dannebrog
Companions of the Distinguished Service Order
Polish emigrants to the United Kingdom